Conrad Coates (born July 12, 1970) is a British-born Canadian actor and teacher. He is best known for his roles as Morgan in The Dresden Files and in Degrassi: The Next Generation as Jimmy Brooks' father.

Biography

Early life 
Coates was born in London, England to immigrants from Jamaica. At a young age he moved to Canada, where he was educated. After school, he worked in local and regional theaters and at the Stratford (Shakespeare) Festival.

Career 
Since 1985, Coates has acted in theatre, film, television and radio. Performing in more than 40 stage productions across the country, including two seasons at The Stratford Shakespeare Festival, North America's largest classical repertory theatre.

With extensive work in Canadian and American television, his work also expands to include writing, producing, teaching and mentoring.

In 2003, he wrote, produced and directed a short film titled "Dakota", and for several years, Coates was a drama teacher for Toronto's multi-discipline "SuiteLife Arts for Youth Program."

He has primarily been cast as bit parts, but has carried supporting character roles in several television series, including Kyle XY, The Zack Files, La Femme Nikita, and These Arms of Mine. He appeared in Percy Jackson & the Olympians: The Lightning Thief as Hephaestus, God of Craft and husband to Aphrodite, Unnatural History as Samuel Tolo & a guest appearance in the Fringe episode What Lies Below as Vincent Ames. He has also appeared in Supernatural as one of Crowley's demons in the episode "Caged Heat". Conrad appears in Saving Hope as Bryan Travers. Currently, he has a recurring role in the 3rd season of the Syfy series Defiance, playing T'evgin, an alien of the race Omec.

As well as commercial, film and television, Conrad teaches an acting school under the name Coates and Company.

Personal life 
Conrad has at least one daughter whom he delivered himself. He is a professor at Seneca College.

Filmography

References

External links

1970 births
Living people
20th-century Canadian male actors
21st-century Canadian male actors
Black British male actors
Black Canadian male actors
Canadian male television actors
Canadian male voice actors
Canadian people of Jamaican descent
Canadian expatriates in England
English emigrants to Canada
English male television actors
English male voice actors
English people of Jamaican descent
Male actors from British Columbia
Male actors from London
Academic staff of Seneca College